Duygu Kuzum (born 1983) is a Turkish-American electrical engineer who is a professor at the University of California, San Diego. She develops transparent neural sensors based on single-layer materials. She was awarded a National Institutes of Health New Innovator Award.

Early life and education 
Kuzum was born in Ankara, Turkey. She became interested in science as a child. She attended Bilkent University and was a doctoral researcher at Stanford University. Her doctoral research considered MOSFETs for CMOS applications. During her doctorate, she completed an internship at Intel. In 2011, she joined the University of Pennsylvania as a postdoctoral researcher, working in the Center for Neuroengineering and Therapeutics on the development of transparent neural electrodes.

Research and career 
Kuzum joined the University of California, San Diego in 2015. Her research focuses on innovative computation strategies based on neural networks. She combines molecular neural sensors with machine learning to better understand neural processes. She has built self-assembled structures from stem cells embedded with controllable neural sensors to mimic the embryonic human brain.

Awards 
 2013 Poptech Fellow
 2014 MIT Technology Review Innovators under 35 
 2016 Office of Naval Research Young Investigator Award 
 2017 IEEE Nanotechnology Council Young Investigator Award 
 2018 NSF Career Award
 2018 National Institutes of Health NIBIB Trailblazer Award 
 2020 National Institutes of Health New Innovator Award

Selected publications

References 

1983 births
Living people
People from Ankara
Bilkent University alumni
Stanford University alumni
University of California, San Diego faculty
Turkish emigrants to the United States
21st-century American women scientists
American electrical engineers
21st-century American engineers
21st-century women engineers